Taegwalli station is a passenger-only railway station of the Korean State Railway in Sin'an-dong, Taegwan County, North P'yŏngan Province, North Korea; it is the terminus of the Taegwalli Line of the Korean State Railway. serving a private facility for the DPRK elite.

References

Railway stations in North Korea